Easington was, from 1974 to 2009, a local government district in eastern County Durham, England. It contained the settlements of Easington, Seaham, Peterlee, Murton, Horden, Blackhall, Wingate and Castle Eden.  It did not however include Easington Lane which is administered as part of the City of Sunderland.

The district was formed on 1 April 1974 by the merger of Seaham urban district with most of Easington Rural District.

It had the lowest percentage of foreign-born residents in England at 1.2% (2001 census).

The district was abolished as part of the 2009 structural changes to local government in England. An electoral ward in the name of Easington still exists. The population of this ward taken at the 2011 census was 7,693.

Electoral divisions 

Blackhalls 	Blackhalls ward; Nesbitt parish; Sheraton with Hulam parish; Hutton Henry and Station Town parish wards of Hutton Henry parish; Hesleden parish ward of Monk Hesleden parish
Dawdon 	Dawdon ward; Seaham Harbour South parish ward of Seaham parish
Deneside 	Deneside ward; Westlea parish ward of Seaham parish
Easington 	Easington Colliery ward; Easington Village parish; Hawthorn parish
Horden 	Horden North ward; Horden South ward
Murton   Murton East ward; Murton West ward
Peterlee East   Dene House ward; Eden Hill ward
Peterlee West   Acre Rigg ward; Howletch ward
Seaham   Seaton with Slingley parish; Seaham Harbour North and Seaham North parish wards of Seaham parish
Shotton   Haswell and Shotton ward; South Hetton parish
Thornley   Thornley and Wheatley Hill ward; Trimdon Foundry parish
Wingate   Passfield ward; Castle Eden parish; Wingate parish

References 

English districts abolished in 2009
Former non-metropolitan districts of Durham